Devonte is a given name. Notable people with the name include:

Devonte Brown (born 1992), American basketball player
Devonte Fields (born 1993), American player of Canadian football
Devonte' Graham (born 1995), American basketball player
Devonte Redmond (born 1991), American football player
Devonte Small (born 1985), American soccer player
Devonte Smith (born 1993), American mixed martial artist 
Devonte Upson (born 1993), American basketball player in the Israeli Basketball Premier League
Isaiah Devonte Cousins (born 1994), American basketball player

See also
Devonta, given name
Devontae, given name